Robert Francis Bernard (May 23, 1961 – February 2, 2007) was an Information Technology executive, most noted for presiding over dot-com bubble consulting flameout marchFIRST, the largest Internet professional services company of its time.  He is also known for co-founding one of marchFIRST's predecessors, Whittman-Hart.

Information
He was the son of an electrician who worked for Chicago's Inland Steel Co.  In 1984, he dropped out of Ball State University to found Whittman-Hart, a software and consulting company focused on delivering solutions for IBM systems.

He was the CEO of the resurrected WhittmanHart in Chicago when he died February 2, 2007, of an apparent heart attack.

References

1961 births
2007 deaths
Ball State University alumni
Businesspeople in information technology
Businesspeople from Chicago
20th-century American businesspeople
People from Burr Ridge, Illinois